"I ljus och mörker" is a single from 2004 by Viktoria Krantz och Martin Stenmarck. The song entered Svensktoppen on 8 February 2004. The song also appears on the album Musikäventyret Arn De Gothia.

References 

2004 singles
2004 songs